Yasmin Siraj (born July 30, 1996) is an American former figure skater. She is the 2010 U.S. junior silver medalist and competed at the 2013 World Junior Championships.

Career 
Siraj began skating at the age of two, following her sister Layla. After taking Basic Skills classes at the Skating Club of Boston, she had private lessons with Sheryl Franks and Bobby and Barbie Martin until the age of eight when she joined coaches Mark Mitchell and Peter Johansson.

In 2010, Siraj won the junior silver medal at the U.S. Championships. The following season, she made her ISU Junior Grand Prix debut, winning two silver medals and qualifying for the JGP Final where she finished seventh. She placed eighth in her senior national debut at the 2011 U.S. Championships.

Siraj was 15th at the 2012 U.S. Nationals but rebounded the following year, finishing 6th at the 2013 U.S. Championships. She was sent to the 2013 World Junior Championships where she finished 11th.

In 2013, Siraj placed sixth at the Junior Grand Prix of Latvia, her only JGP assignment of the season. She won gold for the third consecutive year at the New England Regionals, winning the competition by over 16 points.

In 2014, Siraj placed 16th at the 2014 U.S. Nationals, after which she retired. In 2017, she began skating with the award-winning synchronized skating team, the Haydenettes.

Personal life 
Yasmin Siraj was born in Boston and grew up in Brookline. Her mother Aban Makarechian, is an architect of Iranian descent, and her father Ra'ad Siraj, is managing director of The Bank of New York Mellon of Saudi Arabian background. She has an elder sister, Layla, and younger brother, Amir.

In addition to skating, Siraj has also been a competitive pianist. She won awards at the American Fine Arts Festival and performed three times at Carnegie Hall.

Siraj attended Brookline High School, graduating in 2014. She subsequently attended Harvard College, where The Harvard Crimson, the daily student newspaper, named her one of the fifteen most interesting seniors of 2017-18.

Programs

Competitive highlights

References

External links 

 
 Yasmin Siraj at IceNetwork

1996 births
American female single skaters
American people of Iranian descent
American people of Saudi Arabian descent
Brookline High School alumni
Harvard College alumni
Living people
Figure skaters from Boston
21st-century American women